The VMI Keydets basketball teams represented the Virginia Military Institute in Lexington, Virginia. The program began in 1908, and played their games out of Cameron Hall, as they have since 1981. The Keydets were members of the Southern Conference. Their primary rival is The Citadel.

1989–90

|-
|colspan=7 align=center|1990 Southern Conference men's basketball tournament

1990–91

|-
|colspan=7 align=center|1991 Southern Conference men's basketball tournament

1991–92

|-
| colspan=7 align=center|1992 Southern Conference men's basketball tournament

1992–93

|-
| colspan=7 align=center|1993 Southern Conference men's basketball tournament

1993–94

|-
| colspan=7 align=center|1994 Southern Conference men's basketball tournament

1994–95

|-
| colspan=7 align=center|1995 Southern Conference men's basketball tournament

1995–96

|-
| colspan=7 align=center|1996 Southern Conference men's basketball tournament

1996–97

|-
| colspan=7 align=center|1997 Southern Conference men's basketball tournament

1997–98

|-
| colspan=7 align=center|1998 Southern Conference men's basketball tournament

1998–99

|-
| colspan=7 align=center|1999 Southern Conference men's basketball tournament

References
 

VMI Keydets basketball seasons